Zaręby Kościelne  is a village in Ostrów Mazowiecka County, Masovian Voivodeship, in east-central Poland. It is the seat of the gmina (administrative district) called Gmina Zaręby Kościelne.

The village has a population of 660.

References

External links
 Jewish Community in Zaręby Kościelne on Virtual Shtetl.

Villages in Ostrów Mazowiecka County
Masovian Voivodeship (1526–1795)
Łomża Governorate
Białystok Voivodeship (1919–1939)
Warsaw Voivodeship (1919–1939)
Belastok Region